Belava (Serbian Cyrillic: Белава) is a mountain in eastern Serbia on the outskirts of the city of Pirot. Its highest peak Kardašica has an elevation of 946 meters above sea level.  Nearby villages are Staničenje, Mali Suvodol, Veliki Suvodol and Gnjilan.  The historic Church of St. Petka in Staničenje is located at the base of this mountain.

References

Mountains of Serbia